Big Ugly Wildlife Management Area is located on  near Logan in Lincoln County, West Virginia.  The Big Ugly's steep terrain is covered with mixed hardwoods second growth woodlands. Camping is not allowed at Big Ugly WMA, but is available at nearby Chief Logan State Park.

Directions

From West Hamlin in Lincoln County, follow County Route 100 south to County Route 7.  Turn north on County Route 7 (Greenshoal Road) 
to the community of Leet.

Hunting
Hunting opportunities include deer, grouse, raccoon, squirrel, and turkey.

See also
Animal conservation
Hunting
List of West Virginia wildlife management areas
Recreational fishing

References

External links
West Virginia Division of Natural Resources web site
West Virginia Hunting Regulations
WVDNR Map of Big Ugly Wildlife Management Area

Wildlife management areas of West Virginia
Protected areas of Lincoln County, West Virginia
IUCN Category V